Aguilar is a locality located in the municipality of Graus, in Huesca province, Aragon, Spain. As of 2020, it has a population of 0.

References

Populated places in the Province of Huesca